"Papermill" is a song recorded by American hip hop duo Madvillain. It was released 26 May 2010 as part of the Adult Swim Singles Program.

Background
"Papermill" was intended to serve as the first single from Madvillain's still-unreleased followup to Madvillainy. According to label Stones Throw, the album had been in progress since 2009. The song was the second single released in the 2010 Adult Swim Singles Program. The Madlib-produced beat samples a chopped-up europop song with German lyrics. Adult Swim also released some behind-the-scenes videos to go along with the song of Madlib talking about his creative process while taste-testing some Intelligentsia coffee branded with his name.

Track listing

Personnel

Credits are adapted from Stones Throw's website.
 Doom – MC
 Madlib – beat

References

2010 songs
2010 singles
MF Doom songs
 song recordings produced by Madlib